Adalia decempunctata, the ten-spotted ladybird or ten-spotted lady beetle, is a carnivorous beetle of the family Coccinellidae.

The ten-spotted ladybird was one of the many species originally described by Carl Linnaeus in his 18th-century work, Systema Naturae, its original name was Coccinella decempunctata. Its specific name from the Latin decem "ten", and punctata "spotted".

Varietas
Varietas include:
 Adalia decempunctata var. lutea   (Rossi) 
 Adalia decempunctata var. quattuorpunctata   (Linnaeus) 
 Adalia decempunctata var. octopunctata   Müller
 Adalia decempunctata var. lateripunctata   Gradl. 
 Adalia decempunctata var. humeralis   Schaller
 Adalia decempunctata var. guttatopunctata   (Linnaeus) 
 Adalia decempunctata var. decempustulata   (Linnaeus) 
 Adalia decempunctata var. bipustulata   Herbst

Distribution
Adalia decempunctata is a common Palearctic species found in Europe, North Africa, European Russia, the Caucasus, Siberia, Belarus, Ukraine, Moldova, Transcaucasia and western Asia.

Description
This species is highly variable. Individuals may in fact have a red, orange or brown ground colour and between 0 and 12 distinct dark elytral spots, although rarely more spots have been recorded, up to 15 spots. These beetles  have a glabrous body, with an almost round form. Legs and antennae are usually brown or orange.
The species  includes eight varietas, with three basic forms. The light form shows five to seven black spots on the pronotum and several black spots on the red-orange elytra. The dark form is mainly black or brown in color, and the pronotum has a light border on the sides and front. The mixed form has black or brown in color elytra, each with five orange to red spots. Sometimes these ladybirds have no spots at all.

Biology
It occurs in western European broadleaf forests eastern deciduous forests, Sarmatic mixed forests, at forest edges, and in parks and gardens wastelands and in Eurasian Steppe, Pannonian Steppe biotopes. It is found on bushes and deciduous trees, on grasses, under bark, in moss on trees, in leaf litter, on brushwood, coarse woody debris and in alluvial soil.

The insects feed on aphids on trees and bushes. The adults overwinter in litter and among fallen leaves.

Gallery

References 

Beetles of Europe
Beetles described in 1758
Coccinellidae
Taxa named by Carl Linnaeus